Images is a studio album by Amii Stewart released in April 1981. The album yielded three European single releases, "My Guy/My Girl" (a duet with Johnny Bristol) (#39 UK), "Where Did Our Love Go", and "Great Balls Of Fire" and had been followed by single "Rocky Woman" which was also included on the Mexican edition. Images was released as I'm Gonna Get Your Love in the U.S., with a slightly altered track listing.

In 1985 Stewart recorded a new version of duet "My Guy/My Girl" with Deon Estus that was issued as a single in the UK (#63).

The original Images album in its entirety remains unreleased on compact disc.

Track listing

Side A:
"Where Did Our Love Go" (Holland-Dozier-Holland) – 4:25   
"Great Balls of Fire" (Jack Hammer, Otis Blackwell) – 4:11   
"Save This Night for Love" (Ellison Chase, William Haberman, Arthur Jacobson) – 3:30   
"Digital Love" (Randy Jackson, Narada Michael Walden, Allee Willis) – 3:49   
"Love Is Bad for Your Health" (Gary Sulsh, Stuart Leatherwood) – 3:50

Side B:   
"Why'd You Have to Be So Sexy" (Len Boone, Larry LaFalce) – 3:25   
"Tonight" (Eddie Schwartz) – 3:19   
"Premiere" (Barry Leng, Simon May) – 3:32   
"Don't Let Go of Me" (Randy Edelman) – 3:50   
"My Guy" / "My Girl" (Duet With Johnny Bristol)  (Smokey Robinson, Ronald White) – 3:59

Personnel
 Amii Stewart – vocals
 Johnny Bristol – vocals on "My Guy"/"My Girl".

Production
 Barry Leng – producer 
 Simon May – producer
 Narada Michael Walden – producer

Alternative album editions
 Mexico, additional track "Rocky Woman" (B1).
 USA: I'm Gonna Get Your Love.

1981 albums
Amii Stewart albums
albums produced by Narada Michael Walden
Hansa Records albums